The Federal Reserve Bank of Kansas City is located in Kansas City, Missouri and covers the 10th District of the Federal Reserve, which includes Colorado, Kansas, Nebraska, Oklahoma, Wyoming, and portions of western Missouri and northern New Mexico. It is second only to the Federal Reserve Bank of San Francisco in size of geographic area served. Missouri is the only state with two main Federal Reserve Banks; the other is located in St. Louis.

Federal Reserve Notes issued by the bank are identified by "J" on the face of one and two dollar bills and the J10 on the face of other currency.

The current president is Esther George.

Headquarters buildings

The first bank building was the R.A. Long Building at 928 Grand which opened on November 16, 1914 until a new $4.3 million building could be built across the street at 925 Grand which formally opened in November 1921 in Downtown Kansas City. Shortly after it was established, the bank rented space to outside tenants.
President Harry S. Truman had his office in Room 1107 of the building from when he left the Presidency in 1953 until the Truman Library was completed in 1957.

The historic 925 Grand Building was the oldest building of any Federal Reserve Bank operating at that time. It was sold to Townsend LLC in March 2005 and the Reserve leased back the structure until the new building opened in spring 2008. It was designed by Henry N. Cobb of Pei Cobb Freed & Partners.

Economic policy symposium

Since 1978, the Kansas City Fed has held an annual economic policy symposium. From 1978–1981, it was held at different locations, and from 1982 it has been held in Jackson Hole, Wyoming. From 1978 to 1981 the symposia focused on agricultural economic issues.  Since 1981 topics have been more broad and the symposia have gotten broader attention.

In 2003 and 2005, papers were presented at the symposium that were critical of the status quo, and predicted problems with the unseen risks of derivatives. These ideas in these papers were rejected at the time, but later were seen as having predicted the financial crisis of 2007-2010.

Jackson Hole Consensus 
The 2014 edition of the symposium was widely anticipated. Featuring a speech by European Central Bank president Mario Draghi, it was depicted as the point of emergence of a new consensus in the economics doctrine and institutions, stressing the importance of aggregate demand, countercyclical investments and fiscal policy in opposition to the so-called austerity policies of the Washington Consensus and Berlin View. This paved the way for quantitative easing to begin in 2015.

The Money Museum

The Fed operates a museum at its new site, called The Money Museum. It offers visitors opportunities to learn about the functions of the Federal Reserve system and America's financial systems. Features of the museum include interactive exhibits, a visit to the automated, multi-story cash vault where millions of dollars are secured — one of the largest in the region, viewing of the Harry S. Truman Coin Collection, and an opportunity to lift a real gold bar. The museum is open weekdays for self-guided tours and for one-hour guided tours, except holidays.

Branches

 Federal Reserve Bank of Kansas City Denver Branch
 Federal Reserve Bank of Kansas City Oklahoma City Branch
 Federal Reserve Bank of Kansas City Omaha Branch

Leaders of the bank

A list of leaders of the Kansas City Federal Reserve are listed below. 

Charles Manville Sawyer, Governor (1914–1916)
Jo Zach Miller Jr., Governor (1916–1922)
Willis Joshua Bailey, Governor (1922–1932)
George Henry Hamilton, Governor/President (1932–1941)
Harold Gavin Leedy, President (1941–1961)
George H. Clay, President (1961–1976)
J. Roger Guffey, President (1976–1991)
Thomas M. Hoenig, President (1991–2011)
Esther George, President (2011–2023)
Kelly Dubbert, Acting President (2023–present)

Chairs
Following are chairs of the board of directors of the Kansas City Federal Reserve since 1992.

Board of Directors
The following people are on the board of directors :

According to the Kansas City's website the directors blended as follows:

Class A - Three Class A directors represent commercial banks that are members of the Federal Reserve System. These directors are bankers who are nominated and elected by member banks within the Tenth Federal Reserve District, which includes western Missouri, Nebraska, Kansas, Oklahoma, Wyoming, Colorado and northern New Mexico.  Under the Class A category, a director will be elected by a specific group of member banks classified as either 1, 2 or 3. This classification is based on the total amount of capital and surplus for each commercial bank, with Group 1 banks being the largest. Each group within the class elects one director.

Class B - Three Class B directors represent the public. Class B directors may not be an officer, director or employee of a bank or bank holding company. These directors are also elected by member banks under the same categories as Class A directors.

Class C - Three Class C directors also represent the public, but are appointed by the Board of Governors of the Federal Reserve System. This adds another layer to the blending of public and private control over the nation's central bank. The Board of Governors also selects both the chairman and deputy chairman of each regional Federal Reserve Bank's board of directors from among the Class C directors. These directors are highly insulated from banking relationships. They may not be an officer, director or employee of a bank or bank holding company. Additionally, these directors may not own stock in a bank or a bank holding company.

Popular culture
The heist in the 2008 movie Mad Money takes place at a fictitious version of the bank.

See also

 Federal Reserve Act
 Federal Reserve System
 Federal Reserve Bank
 Federal Reserve Districts
 Federal Reserve Branches
 Federal Reserve Bank of Kansas City Denver Branch
 Federal Reserve Bank of Kansas City Oklahoma City Branch
 Federal Reserve Bank of Kansas City Omaha Branch
 Structure of the Federal Reserve System

References

External links

Kansas City Fed home page
Kansas City Money Museum
The old main office building is at coordinates 

 
Kansas City
Economy of Kansas City, Missouri
Economy of the Western United States
I. M. Pei buildings